Fort Bowie is a 1958 American Western film directed by Howard W. Koch and written by Maurice Tombragel. The film stars Ben Johnson, Jan Harrison, Kent Taylor, Maureen Hingert, Peter Mamakos and Larry Chance. The film was released on February 1, 1958, by United Artists.

Plot
When Major Wharton's ruthless and cruel killings of Apache Indians leaves him convinced a counterattack by the Apache war chief Victorio is inevitable, Captain "Tomahawk" Thompson reports his conclusion to Colonel Garrett, his commanding officer. To get him out of the way while Wharton, an ambitious schemer, tries to arrange to murder Victorio's tribe, Garrett assigns a task to Thompson: Safely escorting the colonel's wife, Alison, who had walked out on him from Tucson to Fort Bowie.

Alison attempts to seduce Thompson along the road to Fort Bowie. Rejected and irate, she lies to her husband, claiming she and Thompson became lovers. Garrett immediately gives Thompson the suicide mission of riding into Indian territory and attempting to make peace with Victorio. Chanzana, a half-blood native girl, once Victorio's lover and who now works in the fort's laundry, fancies Thompson. She goes along to guide him to Victorio. Chanzana frees him and his sergeant when Victorio's Indians take them captive with the intention of torturing them to death. The three successfully escape and head for Fort Bowie.

Major Wharton leads most of the troops at Fort Bowie out to attack Victorio, but they are themselves surrounded and wiped out. Thompson, Chanzana, and Sergeant Major Kukas come on the scene of the massacre and realize the fort is in deadly danger. The captain dispatches Kukas to find patrols he knows the Colonel has sent out and bring them back to Fort Bowie ASAP.

Fort Bowie braces for a battle Colonel Garrett fears they cannot win. Alison apologizes to the colonel for lying about Thompson as the fort braces for Victorio's attack. Outnumbered, the soldiers fight valiantly but cannot hold the walls, falling back into the mess hall where they make a final stand. Victorio loses many of his braves to the "soldier coats" firing from cover before attempting to break into the mess. He and Captain Thompson engage in single combat, Victorio's bowie knife against Thompson's tomahawk. Victorio is killed, and the fort is relieved by a returning patrol the colonel had sent out, which was located by Sergeant Major Kukas. 

When the dust settles, Thompson realizes he is as in love with Chanzana as she is with him. The two of them kiss, a promise for the future, as the sergeant major watches with a knowing smile.

Cast 
Ben Johnson as Capt. Thomas Thompson
Kent Taylor as Col. James Garrett
Jan Harrison as Alison Garrett
J. Ian Douglas as Maj. Wharton
Jerry Frank as Capt. Maywood
Barbara Parry as Mrs. Maywood
Peter Mamakos as Sgt. Maj. Kukas
Johnny Western as cavalry Sergeant
Maureen Hingert as Chanzana (billed as Jana Davi)
Larry Chance as Victorio

Production
Parts of the film were shot in Kanab Canyon, Johnson Canyon, and the Kanab movie fort in Utah.

References

External links 
 

1958 films
United Artists films
American Western (genre) films
1958 Western (genre) films
Western (genre) cavalry films
Apache Wars films
Films directed by Howard W. Koch
Films shot in Utah
1950s English-language films
1950s American films